The women's 800 metres event at the 2002 Asian Athletics Championships was held in Colombo, Sri Lanka on 11–12 August.

Medalists

Results

Heats

Final

References

2002 Asian Athletics Championships
800 metres at the Asian Athletics Championships
2002 in women's athletics